Ahmad Abdulatif (born 1978) is an Egyptian writer and translator. He studied BA and Arabic in Madrid and Granada. He has written five novels and has won several prizes.

Selected works
 The Keymaker (2010), winner of the 2011 the National Prize of novel
 The Clairvoyant (2012); 
 The Book of the Sculptor (2013), winner of the 2015 Sawiris Cultural Award 
 Elias (2014) 
 The Earthen Fortress (2017), nominated for the 2018 Arabic Booker Prize

References

http://www.casaarabe.es/eventos-arabes/show/la-fortaleza-del-polvo

1978 births
Living people
Egyptian writers